Gavilan Peak may mean:
 Gavilán Peak (Southern California), in the Temescal Mountains, in Southern California.
 Gavilán Peak (Arizona)
 Fremont Peak (California), in the Gabilán Range in California. Previously called Gavilán Peak by the Spanish and Mexican colonists.